Nathan James Douglas (born 4 December 1982 in Oxford) is a retired two-time Olympian and British athlete who specialises in the triple jump. He is an eight-time British champion and two-time European silver medalist.

Nathan is a leading Executive High Performance and Resilience Coach.

Athletics career
Douglas won two consecutive British Outdoor Championships claiming gold in the 2004 AAA Championships and the 2005 AAA Championships. The following year he won a silver medal at the 2006 European Athletics Championships in Gothenburg with a jump of 17.21 metres.

In 2007 he won a silver medal at the European Indoor Athletics Championships in Birmingham with a jump of 17.47m, the second longest jump in the world at the time. 

He suffered a major injury in 2007 and, although he managed to compete at the 2008 Beijing Olympics, he struggled to find form as the injury had upset his technique. The injury’s severity and complications ultimately affected his chances of competing at the 2012 Olympic Games.

Douglas continued to compete taking part in World Championships, European Championships and the Commonwealth Games. Nathan was made team captain in 2016.

He went on to win a record eight British Championships including the 2016 British Athletics Championships and Olympic trials, and the 2018 British Athletics Championships. He won his last 16 years after his first, winning the triple jump at the 2020 British Athletics Championships.

Nathan is the most medalled triple jumper in British Championship history with 22 medals, spanning over an international career of 22 years.

International competitions

References

External links

1982 births
Living people
Sportspeople from Oxford
British male triple jumpers
English male triple jumpers
Olympic male triple jumpers
Olympic athletes of Great Britain
Athletes (track and field) at the 2004 Summer Olympics
Athletes (track and field) at the 2008 Summer Olympics
Commonwealth Games competitors for England
Athletes (track and field) at the 2010 Commonwealth Games
Athletes (track and field) at the 2014 Commonwealth Games
Athletes (track and field) at the 2018 Commonwealth Games
World Athletics Championships athletes for Great Britain
European Athletics Championships medalists
British Athletics Championships winners
Black British sportsmen